Halyna Avramenko (born 13 May 1986) is a Ukrainian shooter who competes in running target competitions. She is a four-time World and multiple European champion and medalist.

Career
Halyna was born to a family of sportspeople. Both her father and mother are shooters. Her father Hennadiy Avramenko is Olympic medalist, multiple World and European champion.

She graduated from the National Taras Shevchenko University "Chernihiv Collegium".

External links

1986 births
Living people
Sportspeople from Chernihiv
Running target shooters
Ukrainian female sport shooters
21st-century Ukrainian women